Isabella Ferrari (born 31 March 1964), better known by her stage name of Isabella Fogliazza, is an Italian actress of television, theatre and the cinema. She is best known as the protagonist, Commissioner Giovanna Scalise in the police drama series Distretto di Polizia (Police District) and Distretto di Polizia 2 (Police District 2) which was televised on Mediaset's Canale 5 from 2000 to 2001. At the 1995 Venice Film Festival she won a Volpi Cup award for Best Supporting Actress in the film Romanzo di un giovane povero.

Career 
Ferrari was born Isabella Fogliazza in Ponte dell'Olio, Province of Piacenza, Emilia-Romagna. At the age of 15 she was elected Miss Teenager in a contest held in a discoteque. She made her acting debut at the age of 17 as Selvaggia in the Carlo Vanzini comedy Sapore di mare in 1982; she also performed in the film's sequel Sapore di mare 2- un anno dopo. Since then she has regularly performed in films, television and the theatre. She is best known to the Italian audience as Police Commissioner Giovanna Scalise, the protagonist in the first two seasons of the police drama series Distretto di Polizia.

At the 1995 Venice Film Festival, Ferrari won a Volpi Cup for Best Supporting Actress in the Ettore Scola film Romanzo di un giovane povero in which she played the part of Andreina.

She was nominated to the David di Donatello for Best Supporting Actress in 2006 thanks to her performance in The Goodbye Kiss and in 2008 for her performance in Quiet Chaos.

In 2021, she was selected as jury member for International competition section of 74th Locarno Film Festival held from 4 to 14 August.

Personal life 
Ferrari lives in Rome, Italy, and is the mother of three children. Her eldest daughter, Teresa, who was born in 1995, is by her first husband, Massimo Osti; and her younger daughter, Nina (born 1998), and son, Giovanni (born 2001) are by her second husband, director Renato De Maria.

Filmography

Theatre 
Anestesia totale (2011)
Il catalogo (2010)
Due partite (2006)
I tre alberghi (1999)
Ondine (1994))

References

External links 
 

1964 births
Living people
20th-century Italian actresses
21st-century Italian actresses
Italian film actresses
Italian television actresses
People from the Province of Piacenza
Volpi Cup for Best Actress winners